A banyan, also spelled "banian", is a fig that develops accessory trunks from adventitious prop roots, allowing the tree to spread outwards indefinitely. This distinguishes banyans from other trees with a strangler habit that begin life as an epiphyte, i.e. a plant that grows on another plant, when its seed germinates in a crack or crevice of a host tree or edifice. "Banyan" often specifically denotes Ficus benghalensis (the "Indian banyan"), which is the national tree of India, though the name has also been generalized to denominate all figs that share a common life cycle and used systematically in taxonomy to denominate the subgenus Urostigma.

Characteristics

Like other fig species, banyans bear their fruit in the form of a structure called a "syconium". The syconium of Ficus species supply shelter and food for fig wasps and the trees depend on the fig wasps for pollination.

Frugivore birds disperse the seeds of banyans. The seeds are small, and because most banyans grow in woodlands, a seedling that germinates on the ground is unlikely to survive. However, many seeds fall on the branches and stems of other trees or on human edifices, and when they germinate they grow roots down toward the ground and consequently may envelop part of the host tree or edifice. 
This is colloquially known as a "strangler" habit, which banyans share with a number of other tropical Ficus species, as well as some other unrelated genera such as Clusia and Metrosideros.

The leaves of the banyan tree are large, leathery, glossy, green, and elliptical. Like most figs, the leaf bud is covered by two large scales. As the leaf develops the scales abscise. Young leaves have an attractive reddish tinge.

Older banyan trees are characterized by aerial prop roots that mature into thick, woody trunks, which can become indistinguishable from the primary trunk with age. Old trees can spread laterally by using these prop roots to grow over a wide area. In some species, the prop roots develop over a considerable area that resembles a grove of trees, with every trunk connected directly or indirectly to the primary trunk. The topology of this massive root system inspired the name of the hierarchical computer network operating system "Banyan VINES".

In a banyan that envelops its host tree, the mesh of roots growing around the latter eventually applies considerable pressure to and commonly kills it. Such an enveloped, dead tree eventually decomposes, so that the banyan becomes a "columnar tree" with a hollow, central core. In jungles, such hollows are very desirable shelters to many animals.

From research, it is known that the longevity of banyan tree is due to multiple signs of adaptive (MSA) evolution of genes.

Etymology
The name was originally given to F. benghalensis and comes from India, where early European travelers observed that the shade of the tree was frequented by Banyans (a corruption of Baniyas, a community of Indian traders).

Classification
The original banyan, F. benghalensis, can grow into a giant tree covering several hectares. Over time, the name became generalized to all strangler figs of the Urostigma subgenus.  The many banyan species also include:
 Ficus microcarpa, which is native to Pakistan, India, Nepal, Bangladesh, Bhutan, Sri Lanka, China, Taiwan, the Malay Archipelago, Mainland Southeast Asia, New Guinea, Australia, Ryukyu Islands and New Caledonia, is a significant invasive species elsewhere.
 The Central American banyan (Ficus pertusa) is native to Central America and northern South America, from southern Mexico south to Paraguay.
 The shortleaf fig (Ficus citrifolia) is native to South Florida, the Caribbean islands, Central America, and South America south to Paraguay.  One theory is that the Portuguese name for F. citrofolia, os barbados, gave Barbados its name.
 The Florida strangler fig (Ficus aurea) is also native to South Florida and the Caribbean islands, and distinguished from the above by its coarser leaf venation.
 The Moreton Bay fig (Ficus macrophylla) and Port Jackson fig (Ficus rubiginosa) are other related species.

In horticulture
Due to the complex structure of the roots and extensive branching, the banyan is used as a subject specimen in penjing and bonsai. The oldest living bonsai in Taiwan is a 240-year-old banyan tree housed in Tainan.

In culture

Religion and mythology
Banyan trees figure prominently in several Asian and Pacific religions and myths, including:
 In Hinduism, the leaf of the banyan tree is said to be the resting place for the god Krishna.
In the Bhagavat Gita, Krishna said, "There is a banyan tree which has its roots upward and its branches down, and the Vedic hymns are its leaves. One who knows this tree is the knower of the Vedas." (Bg 15.1) Here the material world is described as a tree whose roots are upwards and branches are below. We have experience of a tree whose roots are upward: if one stands on the bank of a river or any reservoir of water, he can see that the trees reflected in the water are upside down. The branches go downward and the roots upward. Similarly, this material world is a reflection of the spiritual world. The material world is but a shadow of reality. In the shadow there is no reality or substantiality, but from the shadow we can understand that there is substance and reality.
Vat Purnima is a Hindu festival related to the banyan tree. Vat Purnima is observed by married women in North India and in the Western Indian states of Maharashtra, Goa, Gujarat. During the three days of the month of Jyeshtha in the Hindu calendar (which falls in May–June in the Gregorian calendar) married women observe a fast and tie threads around a banyan tree and pray for the well-being of their husbands.  
 In Buddhism's Pali canon, the banyan (Pali: nigrodha) is referenced numerous times. Typical metaphors allude to the banyan's epiphytic nature, likening the banyan's supplanting of a host tree as comparable to the way sensual desire (kāma) overcomes humans.
 In Guam, the Chamorro people believe in tales of taotaomona, duendes, and other spirits. Taotaomona are spirits of the ancient Chamorro that act as guardians to banyan trees.
 In Vietnamese mythology of the Mid-Autumn Festival, the dark markings on the Moon are a banyan, a magical tree originally planted by a man named Cuội on Earth. When his wife watered it with unclean water, the tree uprooted itself with the man hanging on it and flew to the Moon, where he eternally accompanied the Moon Lady and the Jade Rabbit.
 In the Philippines, they are usually referred to as balete trees, which are home to certain deities and spirits.

 In Okinawa, the tree is referred to as gajumaru, which, according to traditional folklore, is the home for the mythical Kijimuna.

Notable banyan trees
 Thimmamma Marrimanu is a banyan tree in Anantapur, located circa  from the town of Kadiri in the state of Andhra Pradesh, India. It is present in the Indian Botanical Gardens and is more than 550 years old. Its canopy covers   
 One of the largest trees, the Great Banyan is found in Kolkata, India. Its canopy covers 
 Another such tree, Dodda Aalada Mara as in "Big Banyan Tree", is found in the village of Ramohalli, on the outskirts of Bangalore, India; it has a spread of circa 2.5 acres.
 The Iolani Palace banyans in Honolulu, Hawaii.  In the 1880s Queen Kapiolani planted two banyan trees within the Iolani Palace grounds. These trees have since grown into large groupings of trees on the old historic palace grounds. 
 Maui, Hawaii has the Banyan Tree in Lahaina planted by William Owen Smith in 1873 in Lahaina's Courthouse Square. It has grown to cover two-thirds of an acre.
 One large banyan tree, Kalpabata, is inside the premises of Jagannath Temple in Puri. It is considered sacred by the devotees and is supposed to be more than 500 years old.
 A large banyan tree lives in Cypress Gardens, at the Legoland theme park located in Winter Haven, Florida. It was planted in 1939 in a 5-gallon bucket.

Other
 The banyan tree is depicted in the coat of arms of Indonesia as a manifestation of the third principle of Pancasila (the unity of all of Indonesia). It is also used in the emblem of Golkar.
 The Economist magazine features an opinion column covering topics pertaining to Asia named "Banyan".
 In southern Vanuatu, the clearings under banyan trees are used as traditional meeting places. The quarterly newsletter of the British Friends of Vanuatu Society is named Nabanga, after the local word for banyan.
 The Banyan Tree is a notoriously difficult room in the 1984 ZX Spectrum platform game Jet Set Willy.
 Vadodara, a city in Gujarat, India, is literally named after Banyan trees. Banyan, locally known as Vad were found in abundance here.
 The Foggy Swamp in Avatar: The Last Airbender consists of a single banyan grove tree.
On 13 December 2021, Chinese Communist Party (CCP) general secretary Xi Jinping personally intervened to punish and demote 10 CCP officials in Guangzhou after they cut down or uprooted thousands of banyan trees.

Gallery

See also
 Bodhi Tree
 Midh Ranjha tree
 The Great Banyan

References

External links

 Stranglers and Banyans, palomar.edu
 Plant Cultures: Banyan tree history and botany, plantcultures.org.uk

 
Sacred trees in Hinduism
Trees in Buddhism
Epiphytes
National symbols of India
Plant common names